Donaghadee Sailing Club is located in Donaghadee, County Down, Northern Ireland on the south approaches to Belfast Lough

The club is one of the clubs on the lough that form part of the Belfast Lough Yachting Conference

Yacht clubs in Northern Ireland
Sports clubs in County Down